Elizabeth Merwin Page Harris (1889–1969) was an American novelist, best known for her bestselling 1939 novel The Tree of Liberty, which was adapted into the 1940 film The Howards of Virginia.

Page was born in Castleton, Vermont, on August 27, 1889. Her father, Alfred Rider Page was a justice of the New York Supreme Court, and her mother, Elizabeth Merwin Roe Page, was a secretary of the Reformed Church in America. Raised in New York, she graduated from Vassar College in 1912, and obtained a masters from Columbia University in 1914. She was a school teacher in Natick, Massachusetts, from 1914 to 1916, and worked for the American Red Cross, Y.M.C.A. and other charities during World War I. She collaborated with her mother on the book In Camp and Tepee: An Indian Mission Story (1915), and authored four books of her own. Her novel Wilderness Adventure (1946) was based on the true story of explorer John Peter Salling. Page married Herbert Taylor Harris in 1954, and died in Oaxaca, Mexico on March 11, 1969.

Bibliography
 Wagons West: A Story of the Oregon Trail (1930)
 Wild Horses and Gold: From Wyoming to the Yukon (1932)
 The Tree of Liberty (1939)
 Wilderness Adventure (1946)

References

External links

1889 births
1969 deaths
20th-century American novelists
American women novelists
Vassar College alumni
20th-century American women writers
Columbia University alumni